The white-ring garden eel (Heteroconger canabus), also known as the Cape garden eel in Mexico, is an eel in the family Congridae (conger/garden eels). It was described by Garry I. McTaggart-Cowan and Richard Heinrich Rosenblatt in 1974, originally under the genus Taenioconger. It is a marine, tropical eel which is known from the Gulf of California, in the eastern central Pacific Ocean.

The white-ring garden eel's diet consists of zooplankton. It is currently listed as Data Deficient at the IUCN redlist due to dispute over its taxonomy, although it notes that if valid, the species may be under threat as a result of inhabiting an intrareef region in a range restricted to 1,000 km2.

References

Heteroconger
Taxa named by Richard Heinrich Rosenblatt
Fish described in 1974